The Teatro Massimo Vittorio Emanuele is an opera house and opera company located on the Piazza Verdi in Palermo, Sicily. It was dedicated to King Victor Emanuel II.
It is the biggest in Italy, and one of the largest of Europe (at the time of its inauguration, it was - with its area of 7730 m2 - the third largest opera house in Europe after the  Palais Garnier in Paris, and the K. K. Hof-Opernhaus in Vienna), renowned for its perfect acoustics.

Construction and opening
An international competition for the creation of the opera house was announced by the Palermo Council in 1864 at the instigation of the mayor, Antonio Starrabba di Rudinì. For many years there had been talk of building a large new theatre in Palermo, worthy of the second biggest city in southern Italy (after Naples) and designed to promote the image of the city following the unification of Italy in 1861.

The opera house was designed, and overseen by the Italian architect Giovan Battista Filippo Basile, who was well known in Sicily for his previous cathedral restoration design in the city of Acireale, as well as garden and villa designs in the city of Palermo and Caltagirone. Following G. B. F. Basile's death in 1891, construction was then overseen by his son, Architect Ernesto Basile.

The Rutelli and Machì Company, represented by Giovanni Rutelli and Alberto Machì (both founding members of the company) was contracted for the main construction of the theatre which, under Architect Giovanni Rutelli's technical and building direction, went from the foundations all the way up to the theatre's attic structures. He was also responsible for all the external decorations of the building. Rutelli initially designed a steam tower crane machine which was then successfully able to lift large stone blocks and Greek/Roman styled columns during construction of the very large theatre.

Giovanni Rutelli belongs to a very old and renowned Italian family of confirmed British Isles origin, a family which also includes architects and sculptor artists from the old Sicilian classic and baroque school as well as building contractors, all entrepreneurs going back to the first half of the 18th century in Palermo. Along with Architect D. Mario Rutelli (Giovanni's great-grandfather), they were considered to be among the most technically and artistically specialized experts in Sicily at that time, especially because of Mario Rutelli and his descendants' profound knowledge and experience in Ancient Greek/Roman architecture, as well as the Norman architectural style. This style required the use of natural thick stone, all of which was part of the structural design. The two very large bronze statues of lions sitting next to the theatre's monumental stairway entrance were created by Giovanni Rutelli's son, sculptor artist Sir Mario Rutelli and Benedetto  
Civiletti.

Construction started on 12 January 1874, but was stopped for eight years from 1882 until 1890. Finally, on 16 May 1897, twenty-two years after the laying of the foundation stone, the fourth largest opera house in Europe at the time — after the Royal Opera House in London, the Palais Garnier in Paris, and the K. K. Hof-Opernhaus in Vienna— was inaugurated with a performance of Verdi's Falstaff conducted by Leopoldo Mugnone.

The interior is decorated and painted by Rocco Lentini, Ettore De Maria Bergler, Michele Cortegiani and Luigi Di Giovanni.

Busts of famous composers were carved for the theatre by the Italian sculptor, Giusto Liva (born in Montebelluna, Treviso in 1847) and several of his sons.

Facilities and recent history

The Teatro Massimo is the largest theatre in Italy. Basile was inspired by ancient and classical Sicilian architecture and, thus, the exterior was designed in the high neoclassical style incorporating elements of the Greek temples at Selinunte and Agrigento. Realized in the late-Renaissance style, the auditorium was planned for 3,000 people, but, in its current format, it seats 1,381, with 7 tiers of boxes rising up around an inclined stage, and shaped in the typical horseshoe style.

In 1974, the house was closed to complete renovations required by updated safety regulations, but cost over-runs, corruption, and political in-fighting all added to the delay and it remained closed for twenty-three years, finally re-opening on 12 May 1997, four days before its centenary. The opera season started again in 1999, although Verdi's Aida was performed in 1998 while work in progress continued.

During the restoration regular opera seasons were performed in Teatro Politeama, a minor building not far from Teatro Massimo. In summer a few performances, usually concerts, ballet and operetta, are held in Teatro della Verdura.

In recent years, "charges of corruption and political meddling…along with budget deficits and heavy debts" have plagued the house, but, under its then part-English music director, Jan Latham Koenig, it was reported that it is once again on track.

2013-2014 was a two-year hiatus under the leadership of the comissario straordinario Fabio Carapezza Guttuso, who brought in Lorenzo Amato and Eytan Pessen as artistic advisors. Under Carapezza Guttuso's leadership the theatre offered a varied programme including Richard Strauss's Feuersnot, Hans Werner Henze's Gisela!, Jaromir Weinberger's Schwanda the bagpiper and an increased ballet activity. The current intendant is the experienced Francesco Giambrone. From 2020 the music director has been Omer Meir Wellber. He replaced Gabriele Ferro, who is now honorary life director.

Media interest
The final scenes of Francis Ford Coppola's film The Godfather Part III (1990) were filmed at the theatre, where the uncle of Francis Ford Coppola, the composer and conductor Anton Coppola, is shown conducting the opera, Cavalleria rusticana.

References

External links

 Teatro Massimo official website (including a virtual visit) 
 Teatro Massimo: Its Art and History 
 City of Palermo official website 

Massimo
Neoclassical architecture in Palermo
Massimo
Theatres completed in 1897
1897 establishments in Italy
Music venues completed in 1897
19th-century architecture in Italy